Antonio Priuli may refer to:
Antonio Priuli (doge of Venice) (1548–1623), 94th Doge of Venice
Antonio Maria Priuli (1707–1772), Italian Roman Catholic cardinal